This is a list of languages spoken in regions ruled by Balkan countries. With the exception of several Turkic languages, all of them belong to the Indo-European family. A subset of these languages is notable for forming a well-studied sprachbund, a group of languages that have developed some striking structural similarities over time.

Indo-European languages

Albanian
Arvanitika
Northwestern Arvanitika
Southcentral Arvanitika
Thracean Arvanitika
Gheg
Standard Albanian
Arbëresh
Tosk
Istrian

Hellenic languages
Cappadocian Greek
Pontic Greek
Standard Greek
Tsakonian

Indo-Aryan languages
Romani

Slavic languages

Eastern South Slavic 
 Bulgarian
 Macedonian

Transitional dialects 
 Transitional Bulgarian dialects
 Transitional Serbo-Croatian dialects (Našinski/Torlakian)

Western South Slavic 
 Slovene
 Serbo-Croatian with standardized varieties based on the Shtokavian dialect:
 Bosnian
 Croatian
 Montenegrin
 Serbian

Regiolects
 Chakavian
 Kajkavian

Romance languages
Aromanian
Istriot (in western Istria)
Istro-Romanian (In eastern Istria)
Italian (on the Adriatic coast)
Ladino (in Greece, Turkey, Bosnia, Serbia, North Macedonia, Bulgaria)
Megleno-Romanian (Meglenenitic)
Romanian

Turkic languages
 Crimean Tatar
 Gagauz
 Tatar
 Turkish

Extinct languages
These are the extinct languages that were once spoken in the Balkans:

 Ancient Macedonian
 Dacian
 Dalmatian
 Eteocretan
 Eteocypriot
 Illyrian
 Lemnian
 Liburnian
 Ottoman Turkish
 Paeonian
 Pelasgian
 Phrygian
 Thracian

See also
 Balkan sprachbund
 Paleo-Balkan languages

 

ast:Llinguas de los Balcanes
pl:Języki bałkańskie